Libia Castro (born 1970, Madrid, Spain) and Ólafur Ólafsson (born 1973, Reykjavik, Iceland) are collaborative artists based in Rotterdam and Berlin.

Career 
Formed in 1997, their artistic practice has grown to encompass a variety of media, genres, and disciplines, from political history to gender studies and sociology. Castro and Ólafsson have exhibited their works at various international venues, including TENT Rotterdam, Liverpool Biennial, the 19th Sydney Biennale, the Centre for Contemporary Arts, Glasgow, and the 54th Venice Biennale.

Solo exhibitions
2014
 Your Country Does Not Exist, Trondheim Kunstmuseum, Trondheim, Norway

2013
 Asymmetry, Tent, Rotterdam, Netherlands

2012
 Under Deconstruction, The National Gallery of Iceland, Reykjavik, Iceland
 Two Ongoing Projects, Galerie Opdahl, Berlin, Germany

2011
 Tu País no Existe, curated by Juan Antonio Alvarez, Centro Andaluz de Arte Contemporáneo, Seville, Spain
 Under Deconstruction, curated by Ellen Bluemenstein, Icelandic Pavillon, 54 Biennale di Venezia, Venice, Italy
 Constitution of Republic of Iceland, curated by Hanna Styrmisdottir, Hafnarborg Art Center, Hafnarfjordur, Iceland

2010
 Lobbyists, curated by Birta Guðjónsdóttir, The Living Art Museum, Reykjavík, Iceland

2009
 Caregivers, curated by Inga Þórey, Suðsuðvestur, Iceland
 Libia Castro & Ólafur Ólafsson, curated by Riccardo Crespi, text by Gabi Scardi, Galleria Riccardo Crespi, Milan, Italy
 Libia Castro & Ólafur Ólafsson, Galerie Opdahl, Berlin, Germany

2008
 Libia Castro & Ólafur Ólafsson, Galeria Adhoc, Vigo, Spain.
 Recent Works, curated by Valeria Schulte-Fischedick, Künstlerhaus Bethanien, Berlin, Germany
 Everybody Is Doing What They Can, curated by Hafpor Yngvason, Reykjavik Art Museum, Reykajavik, Iceland

2007
 Libia Castro & Ólafur Ólafsson, curated by Julieta Manzano, CAC Málaga, Málaga, Spain

2006
 Demolitions and Excavations, Galerie Martin Van Zomeren, Amsterdam, Nethlerlands

2005
 Bone-lady and The Happy Campaign, curated by Theo Tegelaers, Ministry of Work and Social Affairs, The Hague, Netherlands
 Dubble Ruimte, RAM Foundation, Rotterdam, Netherlands
 Dyn Lan Bestiet Net, Deiska The Collection, Amsterdam, Netherlands
 Dyn Lan Bestiet Net, Kunsthuis Syb, Friesland, Netherlands
 Chapter 3: The Noise of Money, Museum ASÍ, Reykjavik, Iceland

2004
 Wir Wünschen Ihnen Einen Angenehmen Aufenthalt, curated by Theo Tegelaers, De Appel CAC, Amsterdam, Netherlands
 Mind Your Step, Step Your Mind, curated by T. Maars, Galerie Akademie Minerva, Groningen, Netherlands

2003
 20 Minus Minutes, curated by Vasif Kortun, Platform Garanti Contemporary Art Center, Istanbul, Turkey
 Camurdili Araniyor! Camurdili Araniyor! / Searching for a Clay Language! Searching for a Clay Language!, Oda Projesi, Istanbul, Turkey

2002
 Un Elemento Más, curated by Natalia Bravo, Alternativa Siglo 21, Málaga, Spain
 Mjög Skemmtileg Sýning, curated by Þóra Þóristdóttir, Gallerí Hlemmur, Reykjavík, Iceland
 Een Plassende Vrouw, curated by Marc Bijl, Central Train Station, Rotterdam, Netherlands

2001
 Etnoskitzco, curated by Arno von Roosmalen, TENT Art centre, Rotterdam, Netherlands

2000
 The Last Minute Show, Straumur Artist Residence, Hafnarfjörður, Iceland
 Shop Window at Laugavegur, Gallerí Sævar Karl, Reykjavík, Iceland
 Baggage + 8 Days / An Excavation, TOKO, Groningen, Netherlands
 7 Performances, Dans Werkplaats Groningen, Groningen, Netherlands

1999
 De Voormalige HBS, De Voormalige HBS, Groningen, Netherlands

1998
 Finding Each Other, Galerie Sign, Groningen, Netherlands

Awards 
2009
 Prix de Rome, Rijksakademie, Amsterdam, Netherlands
 Il Ventre di Napoli Project, BKVB Fonds, Amsterdam, Netherlands

2007
 (shortlist), Prix Gilles Dusein, Paris, France

2006
 (shortlist), Menningarverðlaun DV, Iceland

References 

Art duos